Enteromius kissiensis is a species of ray-finned fish in the genus Enteromius which has only been recorded from a tributary of upper Niger River system in the highlands of Guinea.

References 

 

Enteromius
Taxa named by Jacques Daget
Fish described in 1954